The King's River is a river in Ireland that flows through the counties of Tipperary and Kilkenny. It is part of the Nore catchment area and is a tributary of the River Nore.

Course

Overview
From the townland of Graigaman, in the civil parish of Buolick in the barony of Slievardagh, the King's River drains the southern side of the Slieveardagh Hills. Flowing southeast, it crosses into County Kilkenny where it is joined by the Munster River. It then passes through the town of Callan. Continuing eastwards, it passes Kells. To the west of Thomastown, it finally joins the River Nore.

Detail and tributaries
The King's River begins with the  Coalbrook and Garranacoll streams. It carries on for over  where it is joined by the River Modeshil and River Munster over the next .  The River Kilbride also joins after Callan.  The next  sees the tributaries of Caherlesk and Desart streams, as well as the River Glory and the Stonyford stream. The King's River is then joined by the Ennisnag stream before flowing into the Nore.

Additional tributaries include one that starts as a spring in the townland of Ballyphilip, Balingarry Civil Parish, joining the river above Wilford, one above Enterprise Centre, near Ballingarry, and one at Rivergrove, Kilkenny.

Governance
The responsible local authorities are Tipperary County Council and Kilkenny County Council.

See also
 Rivers of Ireland

References

Footnotes

Sources

External links
 
 
 

Rivers of County Kilkenny
Rivers of County Tipperary